Amka, also known in Arabic as Amqa, is a moshav in the Matte Asher Regional Council of Israel's Northern District, near Acre. The location of the moshav roughly corresponds the former Palestinian village, depopulated during the 1948 Arab–Israeli War. Yemenite Jews founded the village's successor Amka in 1949.

Etymology
Palmer thought the name Amka to come from the Arabic form of “deep”,

History

Ancient period
During the Roman period, the village located at the same site was called Kefar Amqa. In the Byzantine period the location was probably identified with the village of "Amico".

Middle Ages
During the Crusader period, Amka was referred to as Amca. In 1179 Joscelin III acquired the land of the village, and in  1220 Jocelyn III's daughter  Beatrix de Courtenay and her husband Otto von Botenlauben, Count of Henneberg,  sold  their land, including ‘’Amca’’, to the Teutonic Knights.

In 1283, Amka was mentioned as part of the domain of the Crusaders during the hudna between the Crusaders based in Acre and the Mamluk sultan al-Mansur (Qalawun).

Ottoman Empire
Incorporated into the Ottoman Empire in 1517, Amqa appeared in the 1596 tax registers as being in the nahiya (subdistrict) of Akka under the liwa' (district) of Safad, with a population of 215. All the inhabitants were Muslim. The villagers paid taxes on a number of crops, such as wheat, barley, olives, cotton and fruit, and on other types of  produce, such as goats and beehives.

In the early 18th century the village was under control of Shaykh Najm. He had an agreement to sell the cotton from this and other villages under his control exclusively to the Dutch trader Paul Maashook. In return, Maashook would pay the miri (tax slated for funding the annual Hajj caravan), which was normally payable by the village shaykhs (chiefs). The Syrian Sufi teacher and traveler Mustafa al-Bakri al-Siddiqi (1688–1748/9), who traveled through the region in the first half of the 18th century, said that he prayed in the village after visiting the citadel of Atlit. In 1776 the village was used as a base by Ahmad Pasha al-Jazzar to suppress a revolt led by Ali al-Zahir, one of the sons of Sheikh Zahir al-Umar, who ruled the Galilee between 1730 and 1775.

A map by Pierre Jacotin  from Napoleon's invasion of 1799 showed the place, misnamed as El Mead, In the late 19th century, the village was described as being built of stone, situated on a slight rise in a valley, surrounded by olive and fig trees, and arable land. There were an estimated 300 Druze living there. Later, the residents  were described as  Muslims who maintained a village mosque. In 1887, the Ottoman authorities built a school in ´Amqa.

A population list from about 1887 showed that  Amka had about 740 inhabitants, all Muslim.

British Mandate

In the 1922 census of Palestine conducted by the British Mandate authorities, Amqa  had a population of 724 inhabitants, of whom 722 were Muslims and two Christians. The population increased in the 1931 census to 895, all Muslims, living in a total of 212 houses.

Of this, 1,648  dunams were plantations and irrigable land; 3,348 used for cereals, while 36 dunams were built-up (urban) land.

Israel
The village was captured by Israel's 7th Brigade on 16 July 1948 during Operation Dekel. It was largely destroyed, with the exception of its school and its mosque, and most of its inhabitants were expelled, with the exception of its former Druze inhabitants, who still live nearby. Some of the inhabitants remained in Israel as present absentees. On 1 March 1949 a UN observer reported villagers from 'Amqa amongst a large group of people expelled by the IDF which arrived at Salim in the West Bank. He also noted other villagers from 'Amqa in a group expelled on 26 March. In February 1950, the village was declared a closed area. The Arab population remained under Martial Law until 1966.

A group of Yemenite Jewish immigrants were settled in Amka in 1949. Depopulated during the 1948 Arab–Israeli war, all that remains of the Arab village structures are an elementary school for boys, founded under Ottoman rule in 1887 and one mosque. The majority of the remaining Arab buildings of Amqa were destroyed by the Israel Defense Forces (IDF) in the late 1950s on the orders of the Israeli government. The mosque and a schoolroom now used as a warehouse, are the only remaining buildings.

Archaeological sites
Three khirbas (archaeological ruins) lay within Amka's vicinity and contain the foundations of buildings, well-chiseled building stones, presses, and a cistern. During archaeological searches of the area remnants of a Byzantine church were discovered but due to the destruction of the village no foundations could be established. The Amka mosque was inspected by Petersen in 1991. The date of the mosque construction is not known, but it bears a general similarity to the nearby mosque of al-Ghabisiyya, and is probably of a similar age, i.e. early 19th century.

See also
Depopulated Palestinian locations in Israel

References

Bibliography

 

Cohen, A. (1973), Palestine in the Eighteenth Century: Patterns of Government and Administration. Hebrew University, Jerusalem. Cited in Petersen, (2001)
 
 
 
 
  (p.23)

External links and references
Welcome To 'Amqa
'Amqa, Zochrot
Survey of Western Palestine, Map 3:  IAA, Wikimedia commons 
3amqa , Dr. Moslih Kanaaneh

Populated places established in 1949
Mateh Asher Regional Council
Moshavim
Yemenite Jews in Israel
Arab villages depopulated during the 1948 Arab–Israeli War
District of Acre
Populated places in Northern District (Israel)
1949 establishments in Israel